Margery Beddingfield (also known as Margaret Beddingfield) (1742–1763) was a British woman convicted and burnt for murder in 1763.

Biography
Daughter to farmer John Rowe and his wife, Margery was named after her mother and baptized on 29 June 1742 in the Blaxhall church. She was married to John Beddingfield, a farmer, on 3 July 1759. They had one daughter Pleasance and one son John; the latter died when he was four months old. Four years into their marriage, Margery developed an illicit relationship with Richard Ringe, one of the house servants whom she promised to marry as soon as he "destroyed her husband". He at first persuaded a housemaid, Elizabeth Riches, to poison Beddingfield. After her refusal, he bought white arsenic from Aldeburgh and mixed it in John's water, who, fully unaware of their intentions, refused the cup after noticing the sediments.

On the night of 27 July 1762, Margery shared the bed in the nearby kitchen chamber with Elizabeth Cleobald, another maidservant, and Ringe strangled Beddingfield while he was sleeping. To silence the maid, Margery gave her a gown.

The coroner's inquest of Beddingfield's body showed signs of willful murder. He was buried on 30 July. Both Ringe and Margery were tried at Lent Assizes before Baron of the Court of Exchequer Richard Adams. Ringe confessed to his crime and added that Margery's previous affection for him had turned to hatred. She too eventually gave her confession. Since Beddingfield was Ringe's master and Margery's husband, both of them were convicted of petty treason. Margery was strangled and burnt while Ringe was hanged at Ipswich on 8 April 1763 before a huge gathering of onlookers.

References

Bibliography

Further reading
 
 The Genuine Trial of Margery Beddingfield and Richard Ringe

18th-century British women
1742 births
1763 deaths
People executed by strangulation
British female murderers
Mariticides
18th-century British criminals
People executed by England and Wales